Abdera may refer to:

 Abdera, Thrace, a city and municipality in Greece
 Abdera, Spain, an ancient city
 Apache Abdera, an implementation of the Atom Syndication Format and Atom Publishing Protocol
 Abdera (beetle), a genus of false darkling beetles
 Abdera acraea (Acraea abdera), a butterfly of the family Nymphalidae